Erase is the third studio album  by Dutch death metal band Gorefest. It was released in 1994 via Nuclear Blast. While primarily death metal, the album incorporates some slower and more mid-paced ideas reminiscent of heavy metal and is seen as a transition into the death 'n' roll sound heard on the band's later releases.

Track listing

Band members
 Jan Chris de Koeijer – vocals, bass guitar
 Frank Harthoorn – guitar
 Boudewijn Bonebakker – guitar
 Ed Warby – drums

References 

1994 albums
Gorefest albums
Nuclear Blast albums